Miłość (English: "Love") was a Polish Yass music band. The band was founded in 1988 by Ryszard Tymon Tymański, double bassist and guitarist, former leader of new wave group Sni Sredstvom Za Uklanianie. Miłość played free jazz with avantgarde influences and gave birth to, among others, the Tricity and Bydgoszcz jazz bands, and to a style called yass. Miłość recorded two albums with the legendary jazzman Lester Bowie: "Not Two" (1995) and "Talkin' About Life and Death" (1999). The band split up after Olter's death in 2002.

Members
 Ryszard "Tymon" Tymański – double bass, voice
 Jerzy "Mazzoll" Mazolewski – clarinet (until 1991)
 Mikołaj Trzaska – saxophones
 Leszek Możdżer – piano (since 1991)
 Jacek Olter – drums
 Maciej Sikała – saxophones

Discography
 Miłość (1992)
 Taniec smoka (1994)
 Not Two (with Lester Bowie, 1995)
 Asthmatic (1996)
 Muzyka do filmu Sztos (with Tymon i Trupy, 1997)
 Talkin' About Life And Death (with Lester Bowie, 1999)
1983–1986 (2008)
 Nobody's White'' (planned)

References

Polish musical groups